George (Rivers) Wilbanks (born 1958) is an executive recruiter specializing in the asset management and wealth management industries. He has been a pioneer in recruiting in the area of ESG and sustainable investing and in promoting diversity in the investment field.

Industry commentary
Wilbanks is a frequent media commentator and speaker on employment, compensation, organizational management and strategy in the investment field.

Wilbanks has written for and been quoted in many industry publications including CFA Institute Magazine, Columbia Business School's Chazen Global Insights, FundFire and Ignites (the  Financial Times services), InvestmentNews, Institutional Investor and Money Management Executive.

He has often served as moderator and panelist at industry events, including webinars and panels sponsored by the Defined Contribution Institutional Investment Association, the Investment Company Institute, the Insured Retirement Institute, the Money Management Institute, NICSA and the Retirement Investment Income Association.

Topics have included diversity, board governance, distribution strategies, technology and operations.

Career 
Wilbanks is the managing partner of executive search firm Wilbanks Partners, which he founded in 2011. Wilbanks Partners is an executive search and organizational management consulting firm focusing on the asset and wealth management business. Clients have included Chevy Chase Trust, Calvert Investments, Delaware Investments, Fidelity Investments, LPL Financial, State Street Global Advisors and Vanguard. Wilbanks Partners has also developed an expertise in industry associations, having worked with the Sustainability Accounting Standards Board, the Money Management Institute and NICSA. The firm is a member of the Association of Executive Search Consultants, is a signatory to the United Nations Principles for Responsible Investing, and is a member of the Global Impact Investment Network.

Wilbanks is on the advisory board for Vestigo Ventures, a fintech venture capital fund affiliated with the COGO Labs and Link Ventures.

Prior to founding Wilbanks Partners, Wilbanks worked for 26 years at the executive search firm Russell Reynolds Associates in the financial services practice, where he assisted in building the asset and wealth management practice. Before joining Russell Reynolds, he worked at Agtek International and then at The Dreyfus Corporation, where he served as assistant to the chairman supporting business development.

Philanthropy
Wilbanks is a former two term Board member of Planned Parenthood of New York and participated in the recruitment of current CEO Joan Malin.

Education 

Wilbanks graduated from Williams College in 1980 with a degree in Political Philosophy. He earned his MBA (with a concentration in marketing) in 1986 through evening study at New York University's Leonard N. Stern School of Business.

Personal life 

Wilbanks is the son of Dr. Evelyn Rivers Wilbanks, retired professor of art history and archivist, and Dr. George D. Wilbanks, a world-renowned cancer researcher, surgeon and professor of obstetrics and gynecology. He is married to Ann Elizabeth Flocken, who earlier practiced law and subsequently founded the fine arts and antique business Find Weatherly. They have two children, Elizabeth Grace Wilbanks and George Alexander Wilbanks.

References

External links 
 Wilbanks Partners website

Living people
American business writers
1958 births